Goofy is a cartoon character created by The Walt Disney Company. He is a tall, anthropomorphic dog who typically wears a turtle neck and vest, with pants, shoes, white gloves, and a tall hat originally designed as a rumpled fedora. Goofy is a close friend of Mickey Mouse and Donald Duck, and is Max Goof's father. He is normally characterized as hopelessly clumsy and dim-witted, yet this interpretation is not always definitive; occasionally, Goofy is shown as intuitive and clever, albeit in his own unique, eccentric way.

Goofy debuted in animated cartoons, starting in 1932 with Mickey's Revue as Dippy Dawg, who is older than Goofy would come to be. Later the same year, he was re-imagined as a younger character, now called Goofy, in the short The Whoopee Party. During the 1930s, he was used extensively as part of a comedy trio with Mickey and Donald. Starting in 1939, Goofy was given his own series of shorts that were popular in the 1940s and early 1950s. Two Goofy shorts were nominated for an Oscar: How to Play Football (1944) and Aquamania (1961). He also co-starred in a short series with Donald, including Polar Trappers (1938), where they first appeared without Mickey Mouse. Three more Goofy shorts were produced in the 1960s after which Goofy was only seen in television and Disney comics. He returned to theatrical animation in 1983 with Mickey's Christmas Carol. His most recent theatrical appearance was How to Hook Up Your Home Theater in 2007. Goofy has also been featured in television, most extensively in Goof Troop (1992), House of Mouse (2001–2003), Mickey Mouse Clubhouse (2006–2016), Mickey Mouse (2013–2019), and Mickey and the Roadster Racers / Mickey Mouse Mixed-Up Adventures (2017–2021).

Originally known as Dippy Dawg, the character is more commonly known simply as "Goofy", a name used in his short film series. In his 1950s cartoons, he usually played a character called George G. Geef. Sources from the Goof Troop continuity give the character's full name as G. G. "Goofy" Goof, likely in reference to the 1950s name. In many other sources, both animated and comics, the surname Goof continues to be used. In other 2000s-era comics, the character's full name has occasionally been given as Goofus D. Dawg.

Background
According to Pinto Colvig, the original voice artist for the character, Goofy was inspired by a "grinny, half-baked village nitwit" from his hometown of Jacksonville, Oregon, and he had previously used his mannerisms for a stage character he created named "The Oregon Appleknocker". After a discussion with Walt Disney and director Wilfred Jackson, it was decided that this would be the basis for a new member of the expanding Mickey Mouse cast. Colvig would spend the next day in the recording studio acting out the new cartoon character in front of animator Tom Palmer. Based on Colvig's "grotesque poses and expressions", Palmer would sketch out what would become Goofy. Animator Art Babbit is credited for developing his character. In a 1930s lecture, Babbitt described the character as: "Think of the Goof as a composite of an everlasting optimist, a gullible Good Samaritan, a half-wit, a shiftless, good-natured hick".

In the comics and his pre-1992 animated appearances, Goofy was usually single and childless.  Unlike Mickey and Donald, he did not have a steady girlfriend.  The exception was the 1950s cartoons, in which Goofy played a character called George Geef who was married and at one point became the father of a kid named George Junior. In the Goof Troop series (1992–1993), however, Goofy was portrayed as a single father with a son named Max, and the character of Max made further animated appearances until 2004. This marked a division between animation and comics, as the latter kept showing Goofy as a single childless character, excluding comics taking place in the Goof Troop continuity. After 2004, Max disappeared from animation, thus removing the division between the two media. Goofy's wife was never shown, while George Geef's wife appeared—but always with her face unseen—in 1950s-produced cartoon shorts depicting the character as a "family man".

In the comics, Goofy usually appears as Mickey's sidekick, though he also is occasionally shown as a protagonist. Goofy lives in Mouseton in the comics and in Spoonerville in Goof Troop. In comics books and strips, Goofy's closest relatives are his smarter nephew Gilbert. and his grandmother, simply called Grandma Goofy. In Italian comics, he has been given several cousins, including adventurer Arizona Goof (original Italian name: Indiana Pipps), who is a spoof of the fictional archaeologist Indiana Jones.

Goofy's catchphrases are "gawrsh!" (which is his usual exclamation of surprise and his way of pronouncing "gosh"), along with "ah-hyuck!" (a distinctive chuckle) that is sometimes followed by a "hoo hoo hoo hoo!", and especially the Goofy holler. In the classic shorts, he would sometimes say "Somethin' wrong here" (first heard in Lonesome Ghosts) whenever he suspected something was not right about the situation he was currently in, or sing a few bars of "The World Owes Me a Livin'" from The Grasshopper and the Ants (the first instance of Goofy singing this song is On Ice).

According to biographer Neal Gabler, Walt Disney disliked the Goofy cartoons, thinking they were merely "stupid cartoons with gags tied together" with no larger narrative or emotional engagement and a step backward to the early days of animation. As such, he threatened constantly to terminate the series, but only continued it to provide make-work for his animators. Animation historian Michael Barrier is skeptical of Gabler's claim, saying that his source did not correspond with what was written.

Appearances

Early years

Goofy first appeared in Mickey's Revue, first released on May 27, 1932. Directed by Wilfred Jackson this short movie features Mickey Mouse, Minnie Mouse, Horace Horsecollar and Clarabelle Cow performing another song and dance show. Mickey and his gang's animated shorts by this point routinely featured song and dance numbers. It begins as a typical Mickey cartoon of the time, but what would set this short apart from all that had come before was the appearance of a new character, whose behavior served as a running gag. Dippy Dawg, as he was named by Disney artists (Frank Webb), was a member of the audience. He constantly irritated his fellow spectators by noisily crunching peanuts and laughing loudly, until two of those fellow spectators knocked him out with their mallets (and then did the same exact laugh as he did). This early version of Goofy had other differences with the later and more developed ones besides the name. He was an old man with a white beard, a puffy tail, and no trousers, shorts, or undergarments. But the short introduced Goofy's distinct laughter. This laughter was provided by Pinto Colvig. A considerably younger Dippy Dawg then appeared in The Whoopee Party, first released on September 17, 1932, as a party guest and a friend of Mickey and his gang. Dippy Dawg made a total of four appearances in 1932 and two more in 1933, but most of them were mere cameos.

In the Silly Symphonies cartoon The Grasshopper and the Ants, the Grasshopper had an aloof character similar to Goofy and shared the same voice (Pinto Colvig) as the Goofy character.

By his seventh appearance, in Orphan's Benefit first released on August 11, 1934, he gained the new name "Goofy" and became a regular member of the gang along with two other new characters: Donald Duck and Clara Cluck.

Trio years with Mickey and Donald
Mickey's Service Station directed by Ben Sharpsteen, first released on March 16, 1935, was the first of the classic "Mickey, Donald, and Goofy" comedy shorts. Those films had the trio trying to cooperate in performing a certain assignment given to them. Early on they became separated from each other. Then the short's focus started alternating between each of them facing the problems at hand, each in their own way and distinct style of comedy. The end of the short would reunite the three to share the fruits of their efforts, failure more often than success. Clock Cleaners, first released on October 15, 1937, and Lonesome Ghosts, first released on December 24, 1937, are usually considered the highlights of this series and animated classics.

Progressively during the series, Mickey's part diminished in favor of Donald, Goofy, and Pluto. The reason for this was simple: Between the easily frustrated Donald and Pluto and the always-living-in-a-world-of-his-own Goofy, Mickey—who became progressively gentler and more laid-back—seemed to act as the straight man of the trio. The studio's artists found that it had become easier coming up with new gags for Goofy or Donald than Mickey, to a point that Mickey's role had become unnecessary. Polar Trappers, first released on June 17, 1938, was the first film to feature Goofy and Donald as a duo. The short features the duo as partners and owners of "Donald and Goofy Trapping Co." They have settled in the Arctic for an unspecified period of time, to capture live walruses to bring back to civilization. Their food supplies consist of canned beans. The focus shifts between Goofy trying to set traps for walruses and Donald trying to catch penguins to use as food — both with the same lack of success. Mickey would return in The Whalers, first released on August 19, 1938, but this and also Tugboat Mickey, released on April 26, 1940, would be the last two shorts to feature all three characters as a team.

Solo series
Goofy next starred at his first solo cartoon Goofy and Wilbur directed by Dick Huemer, first released on March 17, 1939. The short featured Goofy fishing with the help of Wilbur, his pet grasshopper.

The How to... series

Jack Kinney would take over the Goofy cartoons with the second short Goofy's Glider (1940). Kinney's Goofy cartoons would feature zany, fast-paced action and gags similar to those being made at Warner Bros and MGM, and possibly influenced by Tex Avery. Kinney found Goofy to be "a nice long, lean character that you could move; you could get poses out of him, crazy poses". A sports fan, he would place Goofy in How to... themed shorts in which Goofy would demonstrate, poorly, how to perform certain sports.

How to Ride a Horse, a segment in the 1941 film The Reluctant Dragon, would establish the tone and style of future shorts like The Art of Skiing (1941), How to Fish (1942), How to Swim (1942) and How to Play Golf (1944). Cartoon shorts like How to Play Baseball (1942), How to Play Football (1944) and Hockey Homicide (1945) would feature Goofy not as a single character but multiple characters playing the opposing teams. Animation historian Paul Wells considers Hockey Homicide to be the "peak" of the sports cartoons. Some of the later sports-theme cartoons, like Double Dribble (1946) and They're Off (1948) would be directed by Jack Hannah.

Pinto Colvig had a falling out with Disney in 1937 and left the studio, leaving Goofy without a voice. Kinney recalls "so we had to use whatever was in the library; you know, his laugh and all those things. But he did have a hell of a library, of different lines of dialogue". In addition, the studio had voice artist Danny Webb record new dialog. Kinney also paired Goofy with a narrator voiced by John McLeish: "He had this deep voice, just a great voice, and he loved to recite Shakespeare. So I suggested, my God, we'll get McLeish for a narrator, and don't tell him that he's not doing it straight. Just let him play it". Colvig returned to Disney in 1941 and resumed the voice until 1967.

The Everyman years

Disney had started casting Goofy as a suburban everyman in the late 1940s. And with this role came changes in depiction. Goofy's facial stubble and his protruding teeth were removed to give him a more refined look. His clothing changed from a casual style to wearing business suits. He began to look more human and less dog-like, with his ears hidden in his hat. By 1951, Goofy was portrayed as being married and having a son of his own. Neither the wife nor the son was portrayed as dog-like. The wife's face was never seen, but her form was human. The son lacked Goofy's dog-like ears. One notable short made during this era is Motor Mania (1950). Kinney disliked making most of these later shorts, stating "...those pictures were disasters, because I didn't fight it hard enough". Goofy would also be given a formal name in these cartoons, George Geef.

Christopher P. Lehman connects this depiction of the character to Disney's use of humor and animal characters to reinforce social conformity. He cites as an example Aquamania (1961), where everyman Goofy drives to the lake for a boat ride. During a scene depicting a pile-up accident, every car involved has a boat hitched to its rear bumper. Goofy is portrayed as one of the numerous people who had the same idea about how to spend their day. Every contestant in the boat race also looks like Goofy. Lehman does not think that Disney used these aspects of the film to poke fun at conformity. Instead, the studio apparently accepted conformity as a fundamental aspect of the society of the United States. Aquamania was released in the 1960s, but largely maintained and prolonged the status quo of the 1950s. The decade had changed but the Disney studio followed the same story formulas for theatrical animated shorts it had followed in the previous decade. And Lehman points that Disney received social approval for it. Aquamania itself received a nomination for the Academy Award for Best Animated Short Film.

Later appearances
After the 1965 educational film Goofy's Freeway Troubles, Goofy was mostly retired except for cameos because of the cartoons' fading popularity and the death of voice actor Pinto Colvig. Goofy had an act in the 1969 tour show Disney on Parade with costar Herbie the Love Bug. His profile began to rise again after his appearance in Mickey's Christmas Carol as the ghost of Jacob Marley. After that, he appeared in Sport Goofy in Soccermania, a 1987 television special.  He made a brief appearance in Disney/Amblin's Academy Award-winning film Who Framed Roger Rabbit, in which the titular character, Roger Rabbit, says of Goofy: "Nobody takes a wallop like Goofy! What timing! What finesse! What a genius!". He later appears at the end of the film with the other characters.

 
In the 1990s, Goofy got his own TV series called Goof Troop. In the show, Goofy lives with his son Max and his cat Waffles, and they live next door to Pete and his family. Goof Troop eventually led to Goofy and Max starring in their own movies: A Goofy Movie (in 1995) and An Extremely Goofy Movie (in 2000); as well as starring in their own segments of Mickey's Once Upon a Christmas (in 1999) and Mickey's Twice Upon a Christmas (in 2004). While Goofy is clearly depicted as a single custodial parent in all of these appearances, by the end of An Extremely Goofy Movie he begins a romance with the character Sylvia Marpole, Max being grown and in college by this point.

In one episode of Bonkers, Goofy has an off-screen cameo whose distinctive laugh is "stolen" by a disgruntled toon. In another episode, both he and Pete cameo as actors who film cartoons at Wackytoon Studios. And in a third episode, Goofy cameos as part of a group of civilians held hostage in a bank robbery.

Goofy returned to his traditional personality in Mickey Mouse Works and appeared as a head waiter in House of Mouse (2001 to 2004). Goofy's son Max also appeared in House of Mouse as the nightclub's valet, so that Goofy juggled not only his conventional antics but also the father-role displayed in Goof Troop and its aforementioned related media. In both Mickey Mouse Works and House of Mouse, Goofy also seemed to have a crush on Clarabelle Cow, as he asks her on a date in the House of Mouse episode "Super Goof" and is stalked by the bovine in the Mickey Mouse Works cartoon "How To Be a Spy". Though Clarabelle was noted as Horace Horsecollar's fiancé in early decades, comics from the 1960s and 1970s and in later cartoons like the aforementioned House of Mouse and Mickey Mouse Works, as well as Mickey, Donald, Goofy: The Three Musketeers, imply some mutual affections between Goofy and Clarabelle; perhaps as an attempt for Disney to give Goofy a more mainstream girlfriend to match his two male co-stars.

On Disney's Toontown Online, an interactive website for kids, Goofy previously ran his own neighborhood called Goofy Speedway until the close of Toontown. Goofy Speedway was a place where players could race cars and enter the Grand Prix. Tickets were exclusively spent on everything there, instead of the usual jellybean currency. The Grand Prix only came on "Grand Prix Monday" and "Silly Saturday". Goofy's Gag Shop was also found in almost every part of Toontown' except Cog HQs, Goofy Speedway, or Chip & Dale's Acorn Acres. At Goofy's Gag Shop, Toons could buy gags.

Goofy also appears in the children's television series, Mickey Mouse Clubhouse, with his trademark attire and personality. Goofy appeared in The Lion King 1½. Goofy starred in a new theatrical cartoon short called How to Hook Up Your Home Theater, that premiered at the Ottawa International Animation Festival. The short received a positive review from animation historian Jerry Beck and then had a wide release on December 21, 2007, in front of National Treasure: Book of Secrets and has aired on several occasions on the Disney Channel.

In 2011, Goofy appeared in a promotional webtoon advertising Disney Cruise Line. He is also a main character on Mickey and the Roadster Racers. He has also appeared in the third season of the 2017 DuckTales TV series; based on his Goof Troop incarnation. Guest starring in the episode, "Quack Pack", Goofy appears as the Duck family's wacky neighbor after Donald accidentally wished them into a '90s sitcom. Donald hires him to be the photographer for a family photo, but after the Ducks realize what Donald did, Goofy helps him understand that "normal" does not necessarily mean the same thing between families; using the relationship he has with his son Max as an example.

In 2021, it was announced that Goofy would star in a new series of "How to..." shorts entitled How to Stay at Home in a reflection of the COVID-19 pandemic. Animator Eric Goldberg (the Genie from Aladdin) will serve as director of the shorts as well as supervising animator on one of them, while Mark Henn (Belle and Princess Jasmine) and Randy Haycock (Naveen in The Princess and the Frog) will serve as supervising animators for other shorts. Once again, Farmer will voice the Goof with Corey Burton narrating. Among the announced shorts include "How to Wear a Mask", "Learning to Cook", and "Binge Watching". The shorts were released on Disney+ on August 11, 2021.

Filmography

Solo short films
 Goofy and Wilbur (1939)
 Goofy's Glider (1940)
 Baggage Buster (1941)
 The Art of Skiing (1941)
 The Art of Self Defense (1941)
 How to Play Baseball (1942)
 The Olympic Champ (1942)
 How to Swim (1942)
 How to Fish (1942)
 El Gaucho Goofy (1943, originally part of Saludos Amigos, 1942)
 Victory Vehicles (1943)
 How to Be a Sailor (1944)
 How to Play Golf (1944)
 How to Play Football (1944)
 Tiger Trouble (1945)
 African Diary (1945)
 Californy er Bust (1945)
 Hockey Homicide (1945)
 A Knight for a Day (1946)
 Double Dribble (1946)
 Foul Hunting (1947)
 They're Off (1948)
 The Big Wash (1948)
 Goofy Gymnastics (1949)
 Tennis Racquet (1949)
 How to Ride a Horse (1950, originally part of The Reluctant Dragon, 1941)
 Home Made Home (1950)
 Tomorrow We Diet! (1950)
 Motor Mania (1950)
 Hold That Pose (1950)
 Lion Down (1951)
 Cold War (1951)
 Get Rich Quick (1951)
 Fathers Are People (1951)
 Teachers Are People (1951)
 No Smoking (1951)
 Father's Lion (1952)
 Hello, Aloha (1952)
 Man's Best Friend (1952)
 Two Gun Goofy (1952)
 Two Weeks Vacation (1952)
 How to Be a Detective (1952)
 Father's Day Off (1953)
 For Whom the Bulls Toil (1953)
 Father's Week-End (1953)
 How to Dance (1953)
 How to Sleep (1953)
 Aquamania (1961)
 Freewayphobia (1965)
 Goofy's Freeway Troubles (1965)
 How to Hook Up Your Home Theater (2007)
 The Art of Vacationing (2012)
 How to Stay at Home (2021)

Theatrical Donald and Goofy cartoons
Besides his own solo cartoons and supporting character in Mickey Mouse shorts, there were also made some theatrical shorts presented as Donald and Goofy cartoons (although these cartoons are commonly treated as part of Donald shorts):

 Polar Trappers (1938)
 The Fox Hunt (1938)
 Billposters (1940)
 No Sail (1945)
 Frank Duck Brings 'em Back Alive (1946)
 Crazy with the Heat (1947)

Feature films
 A Goofy Movie (1995)
 An Extremely Goofy Movie (2000)

Movie cameos
 The Falcon Strikes Back (1943) (as a puppet)
 Who Framed Roger Rabbit (1988) – Oscar winner
 The Little Mermaid (1989) – Oscar winner
 Aladdin (1992) – Oscar winner
 Flubber (1997)
 The Lion King 1½ (2004)
 Saving Mr. Banks (2013)

TV specials
 Goofy's Success Story (1955)
 Goofy's Sports Story (1957)
 A Disney Halloween (1983)
 Disneyland 30th Anniversary TV Special (1985)
 A Very Merry Christmas Parade (1989)
 Disney's Celebrate The Spirit (1992)
 The Wonderful World Of Disney: 40 Years Of Magic (1994)
 Disneyland 40th Anniversary TV Special (1995)
 Disneyland 50th Anniversary TV Special (2005)
 Disneyland 60th Anniversary TV Special (2015)
 Mickey's Tale of Two Witches (2021)
 Mickey and Minnie Wish Upon a Christmas (2021)
 Mickey Saves Christmas (2022)

Comics
Comic strips first called the character Dippy Dawg, but his name changed to Goofy by 1936. In the early years, the other members of Mickey Mouse's gang considered him a meddler and a pest but eventually warmed up to him.

The Mickey Mouse comic strip drawn by Floyd Gottfredson was generally based on what was going on in the Mickey Mouse shorts at the time, but when Donald Duck's popularity led to Donald Duck gaining his own newspaper strip, Disney decided that he was no longer allowed to appear in Gottfredson's strips. Accordingly, Goofy remained alone as Mickey's sidekick, replacing Horace Horsecollar as Mickey's fellow adventurer and companion. Similarly in comics, the Mickey Mouse world with Goofy as Mickey's sidekick was usually very separate from the Donald Duck world and crossovers were rare. Goofy also has a characteristic habit of holding his hand in front of his mouth, a trademark that was introduced by Paul Murry.

A character called "Glory-Bee" was Goofy's girlfriend for some years.

In 1990, when Disney was publishing their own comics, Goofy starred in Goofy Adventures, that featured him starring in various parodies. Unfortunately, perhaps because of poor sales, Goofy Adventures was the first of the company's titles to be canceled by the Disney Comics Implosion, ending at its 17th issue.

Super Goof

Super Goof is Goofy's superhero alter ego who gets his powers by eating super goobers (peanuts). Goofy became the first Disney character to also be a superhero, but several would follow, including Donald Duck as Paperinik.

The initial concept was developed by Disney Publications Dept. head George Sherman and Disney United Kingdom merchandising representative Peter Woods. It was passed on to Western Publishing scripter Del Connell who refined it, including the eventual device of peanuts providing superpowers.

The initial version of Super Goof appeared in "The Phantom Blot meets Super Goof", in Walt Disney's The Phantom Blot No. 2 (Feb. 1965) by Connell (story) and Paul Murry (art). There Goofy mistakenly believes he has developed superpowers. A second version appeared as an actual superhero in the four-page story "All's Well That Ends Awful" in Donald Duck No. 102 (July 1965), also by Connell and Murry.

The third and definitive version debuted in "The Thief of Zanzipar" in Walt Disney Super Goof No. 1 (Oct. 1965), written by Bob Ogle and drawn by Murry, in which the origin of his powers are special peanuts Goofy finds in his backyard. In this story, Super Goof battles the Super Thief, a scientific genius who shrinks world landmarks, and holds them for ransom.

The effect of Super Goof's special peanuts is temporary, so the superpowers wear off after a couple of hours. Many stories use this as a comical effect with the powers wearing off at the most inappropriate time. The peanuts give similar superpowers to whoever eats them, not just Goofy. In some stories, random criminals who have accidentally eaten the peanuts have temporarily become supervillains.

In a crossover story, Huey, Dewey and Louie found a super goober plant sprouted by a dropped goober, and "borrowed" Super Goof's powers; after doing a round of super deeds, the ducks' powers faded, and they had to be rescued by the Junior Woodchucks. On occasion, Gilbert uses the super goobers to become a superhero under the name Super Gilbert, beginning with the story "The Twister Resisters" in Walt Disney Super Goof No. 5.

Gold Key Comics subsequently published the comic-book series Walt Disney Super Goof for 74 issues through 1984. A handful of stories were scripted by Mark Evanier. Additional Super Goof stories (both original and reprints) appeared in Walt Disney Comics Digest. The Dynabrite comics imprint issued by Western in the late 1970s and Disney Comic Album No. 8 (1990) from Disney Comics contained reprints. Gemstone reprinted a Disney Studio Program story written by Evanier and drawn by Jack Bradbury as a backup in its 2006 release Return of the Blotman.

On Disney's Toontown Online during the Halloween season, Goofy is Super Goof for the occasion. He also appeared in one episode of Disney's House of Mouse and in two episodes of Mickey Mouse Clubhouse. In the Disney Channel Mickey Mouse TV series, Goofy dresses as Super Goof for the half-hour Halloween special.

In video games

Kingdom Hearts series

Goofy is the captain of the royal guard at Disney Castle in the Kingdom Hearts video game series. Averse to using actual weapons, Goofy fights with a shield. Following a letter left by the missing king Mickey Mouse, Goofy and Donald, the court magician, meet Sora and embark on a quest with him to find the King and Sora's missing friends. In the game series, Goofy still suffers from being the butt of comic relief, but also is the constant voice of optimism and, surprisingly, selectively perceptive, often noticing things others miss and keeping his cool when Sora and Donald lose it. Goofy's loyalty was also tested when Riku wielded the Keyblade thus, following the king's orders, he followed Riku instead. As Riku was about to attack Sora, Goofy used his shield to protect Sora; thus disobeying the king. When Sora, Donald, and Goofy enter the realm known as Timeless River, Goofy states that the world looks familiar; a reference to his cartoons done in the early to mid-1930s. At many times in the Kingdom Hearts series, Goofy is shown to still be his clumsy self, however, in Kingdom Hearts II, he is very keen to details and has very accurate assumptions of certain things. For example, he was the first to figure out why Organization XIII was after the Beast, and he was the first to see through Fa Mulan's disguise and discovery that Mulan was actually a woman dressed as a male soldier. There were even several instances where Goofy seemed to have more common sense than Sora and Donald, even saying they should "look before we leap" when Sora and Donald saw Mushu's shadow resembling a dragon, that Sora had mistaken for a Heartless.

Goofy reappears in the prequel, Kingdom Hearts: Birth by Sleep, in a relatively minor role, having accompanied Mickey (along with Donald) to Yen Sid's tower to watch Mickey's Mark of Mastery Exam. Upon realizing that Mickey has been abducted and taken to the Keyblade Graveyard by Master Xehanort in an attempt to lure Ventus out, Goofy and Donald prepare to venture out to rescue Mickey, but as they will obviously be no match for Master Xehanort, Ventus goes alone. Donald and Goofy later care for their King as he recuperates from his injuries.

In other video games

 Goofy was the star of an early platformer, Matterhorn Screamer, for the Apple II and Commodore 64.
 Goofy appears as the owner (or perhaps simply the cashier) of the "Junk" store in Donald Duck's Playground, developed and published in the 1980s by Sierra On-Line for the Commodore 64, IBM PC, Apple II, Amiga, and Atari ST.
 Goofy also starred in Super NES action game Goof Troop alongside his son Max and in Goofy's Hysterical History Tour for the Sega Genesis where he is the head janitor and he must recover the missing pieces of some museum exhibits.
 Goofy appears briefly in Quackshot, a Genesis game that starred Donald Duck. Goofy is located within the ancient ruins in Mexico and gives Donald the red plunger (an upgrade to Donald's plunger gun allows the climbing of walls) and a strange note that solves a puzzle in Egypt later in the game.
 He also was in the GameCube and Game Boy Advance game Disney's Party as one of the playable characters.
 Two games for kids were released: Goofy's Fun House for the PlayStation and Goofy's Railway Express for the Commodore 64.
 He also appears 2001 in Disney's Extremely Goofy Skateboarding for PC.
 Goofy is a playable character in Disney TH!NK Fast.
 Concept art for Goofy was made for his appearance in the 2009 & 2010 Wii game, Epic Mickey. He appears as one of the "buddies" that the Mad Doctor creates for Oswald the Lucky Rabbit to replicate the facade of Mickey Mouse's success. A variation of him seems to appear as a minor shopkeeper named Tiki Sam.
 Goofy briefly appears in Disney's Magical Quest for Super NES, released in 1992.
 As noted above, Goofy appears in Disney's online game Toontown Online.
 Goofy was also a playable character in Disney Golf for the PS2.
 Goofy will appear as a playable character in Disney Illusion Island.

Voice actors
Pinto Colvig voiced Goofy for most of his classic appearances from 1932 (Mickey's Revue) to 1938 (The Whalers) when he had a fallout with Disney and left the company to work on other projects. He was later replaced by Danny Webb from 1939 to 1941. However, Colvig returned to Disney and resumed the role in 1944 (How to Be a Sailor) until shortly before his death in 1967. One of his last known performances as the character was for the Telephone Pavilion at Expo 67. Many cartoons featured Goofy silent, recycled dialogue from earlier shorts, or had various different-sounding Goofys instead of the original. Colvig also gave Goofy a normal voice for four George Geef shorts. 

Stuart Buchanan voiced Goofy in The Mickey Mouse Theater of the Air. Richard Edwards voiced Goofy in the end of Mickey's Trailer and some lines in The Whaler. George Johnson voiced Goofy in No Sail. Bob Jackman took Colvig's place when he left the Disney Studios for unknown reasons and voiced Goofy in 1951 for a brief time. Gilbert Mack voiced Goofy in the 1955 Golden Records record, Goofy the Toreador. Jimmy MacDonald, the voice of Mickey Mouse, voiced Goofy in Lion Down and the 1960s Disney album, Donald Duck and his Friends. Bill Lee provided the singing voice for Goofy on the 1964 record, Children's Riddles and Game Songs. Hal Smith began voicing Goofy in 1967 after Pinto Colvig's death and voiced him until Mickey's Christmas Carol in 1983. Walker Edmiston voiced Goofy in the Disneyland record album An Adaptation of Dickens' Christmas Carol, Performed by The Walt Disney Players in 1974. Will Ryan did the voice for DTV Valentine in 1986 and Down and Out with Donald Duck in 1987. Tony Pope voiced Goofy in the 1979 Disney album, Mickey Mouse Disco for the song, "Watch out for Goofy". He then voiced him in Sport Goofy in Soccermania in 1987 and Who Framed Roger Rabbit in 1988. 

Aside from those occasions, Bill Farmer has been voicing Goofy since 1987. While Pope was the sole voice credit for Goofy in Roger Rabbit, Farmer actually provided some of Goofy's lines in the movie as well. Farmer closely imitated Colvig for projects like The Prince and the Pauper but began putting his own spin on the character in 1992's Goof Troop. Farmer also inherited Colvig's other characters, like Pluto, Sleepy, and Practical Pig. Although, in 2001, Jason Marsden (voice actor of Goofy's son Max) provided the voice of Goofy in the DVD storybook adaptation of the 1994 children's storybook Me and My Dad, included as a bonus feature on the DVD release of An Extremely Goofy Movie.

Relatives

Max Goof

Max Goof is Goofy's teenage son. He first appeared in the 1992 television series Goof Troop and stars in both the spin-off film A Goofy Movie (1995) and its direct-to-video sequel An Extremely Goofy Movie (2000). He also features in the direct-to-video Mickey's Once Upon a Christmas (1999), its sequel Mickey's Twice Upon a Christmas (2004), and the 2001 TV series House of Mouse. Max is a playable character on the Super NES video game Goof Troop (1993), the PlayStation 2 video game Disney Golf (2002), and the PC video game Disney's Extremely Goofy Skateboarding (2001).

Max is one of the few Disney characters aside from his best friend P.J. and Huey, Dewey, and Louie, child or otherwise, who has actually aged in subsequent appearances. He was depicted as an eleven-year-old middle school student in Goof Troop, then a high school student in A Goofy Movie, and then a high school graduate teenager starting college in An Extremely Goofy Movie. In Disney's House of Mouse, he is still a teenager but old enough to be employed as a parking valet.

Goofy holler
The Goofy holler is a stock sound effect that is used frequently in Walt Disney cartoons and films. It is the cry Goofy makes when falling or being launched into the air, that can be transcribed as "Yaaaaaaa-hoo-hoo-hoo-hooey!" The holler was originally recorded by yodeller Hannès Schroll for the 1941 short The Art of Skiing. Some sources claim that Schroll was not paid for the recording. Bill Farmer, the current voice of Goofy, demonstrated the "Goofy Holler" in the Disney Treasures DVD The Complete Goofy. He also does this in the Kingdom Hearts games.

The holler is also used in films and cartoons in which Goofy does not appear, generally in situations that are particularly "goofy" (examples include Cinderella, Bedknobs and Broomsticks, Pete's Dragon, The Rescuers, Condorman, The Hunchback of Notre Dame, Home on the Range, Enchanted, and Moana).

In a Batman: The Animated Series episode titled "The Strange Secret of Bruce Wayne", the Joker performs the holler when the plane crashes toward a canyon.

The Goofy holler unusually appeared in the Street Fighter movie, where one of M. Bison's troopers performed the holler after he was sent back from an explosion.

In the "Wacky Delly" episode of Rocko's Modern Life, the holler is heard at the end of the haphazardly made cartoon created by Rocko, Heffer Wolfe, and Filburt for Ralph Bighead.

An imitation of the holler is used in a cut-away in the "Dial Meg for Murder" episode of Family Guy when Goofy is cast into Hell for causing 9/11.

In Epic Mickey 2: The Power of Two, the cry is referred to as the "Goofy Yell".

See also
 Dogfaces (comics)

References

External links

 
 Disney's bio of Goofy
 Goofy on IMDb
 Goofy at Don Markstein's Toonopedia. Archived from the original on August 28, 2016.

Goofy (Disney)
Comedy film characters
Disney comics characters
Anthropomorphic dogs
Male characters in animation
Male characters in comics
Film characters introduced in 1932
Fictional characters from Calisota
Disney core universe characters